General Christie may refer to:

Gabriel Christie (British Army officer) (1722–1799), British Army general
Johan Koren Christie (air force officer) (1909–1995), Royal Norwegian Air Force major general
Werner Hosewinckel Christie (air force officer) (1917–2004), Royal Norwegian Air Force major general